Brazil competed at the 1992 Summer Olympics in Barcelona, Spain. 182 competitors, 132 men and 50 women, took part in 107 events in 23 sports. Brazilian Team has conquered only 3 medals in Barcelona. It was the lowest number since Montreal 1976, but unlike Montreal, two of the three medals were gold and this is also until the date of the games the best result of the country, as the Barcelona Games was the first without boycotts since the Mexico City games in 1968.

The swimmer Gustavo Borges was a silver medalist in men's 100 metre freestyle. It was the first medal won by Borges, who has four Olympic medals (a total record among all Brazilian swimmers).

The judoka Rogério Sampaio won the gold medal in men's 65 kg category. In the final, he defeated József Csák from Hungary.

Brazil men's national volleyball team made history by conquering the first gold medal ever won by Brazilians not only in Volleyball but also in a team sport event. The team won all the eight matches of the tournament and losing only three sets. The gold medal was a surprise, given the team was young, had not achieved significant results in previous competitions and Italy was the favorite. In the gold-medal match, Brazil defeated Netherlands by 3 sets to 0.

Medalists

Competitors
The following is the list of number of competitors in the Games.

Archery

In its fourth Olympic archery competition, Brazil sent two men. Only one qualified for the elimination rounds, where he was defeated in the first match.

Men's Individual Competition:
Vitor Krieger — Round of 32, 30th place (0-1)
Dutra Mello — Ranking round, 49th place (0-0)

Athletics

Men
Track & road events

Field events

Combined events – Decathlon

Women
Track & road events

Basketball

Men's

Preliminary round

Group A

Quarter-finals

Semifinals 5th−8th

5th-place game 

Team Roster:
 ( 4.) Paulo Villas Boas 
 ( 5.) Jorge Guerra
 ( 6.) Gerson Victalino
 ( 7.) João José Vianna
 ( 8.) Rolando Ferreira
 ( 9.) Ricardo Cardoso
 (10.) Maury Ponickwar
 (11.) Marcel Ponickwar
 (12.) Aristides Santos
 (13.) Wilson Fernando Kuhn
 (14.) Oscar Schmidt
 (15.) Israel Machado

Women's

Preliminary round

Group A

Semifinals

7th-place game 

Team Roster
Hortência Marcari
Janeth Arcain
Helen Cristina
Nádia Bento
Vânia Hernandes
Maria Paula Gonçalves
Adriana Santos
Marta Sobral
Ruth Roberta de Souza
Maria José Bertolotti
Joycenara Batista
Simone Pontello

Boxing

Men

Canoeing

Slalom

Sprint
Men

Cycling

Seven cyclists, six men and one woman, represented Brazil in 1992.

Road

Track
Points race

Diving

Women

Equestrianism

Eventing

Show jumping

Fencing

Four fencers, all male, represented Brazil in 1992.

Men's épée
 Roberto Lazzarini
 Luciano Finardi
 Francisco Papaiano

Men's sabre
 Ricardo Menalda

Gymnastics

Handball

Men

Preliminary round

Group A

11th/12th classification

Team Roster
José Luiz Aguiar e Ramalho
Sergio Carnasciali Cavichiolo
Drean Farencena Dutra
Milton Fonseca Pelissari
Rodrigo Hoffelder
Osvaldo Inocente Filho
Gilberto Jesus Cardoso
José Luiz Lopes Vieira
Ricardo Matos Pereira
Ivan Bruno Maziero
Marcelo Minhoto Ferraz
Paulo Rogerio Moratore
José Ronaldo Nascimiento
Claudio Oliveira Brito
Ivan Raimundo Pinheiro
Edson Roberto Rizzo
Head coach: Antonio Carlos Simões

Judo

Men's Extra-Lightweight
Shigueto Yamasaki

Men's Half-Lightweight
Rogério Sampaio

Men's Lightweight
Sérgio Oliveira

Men's Half-Middleweight
Ezequiel Paraguassu

Men's Middleweight
Wagner Castropil

Men's Half-Heavyweight
Aurélio Miguel

Men's Heavyweight
José Mario Tranquillini

Women's Extra-Lightweight
Andrea Rodrigues

Women's Half-Lightweight
Patricia Bevilacqua

Women's Lightweight
Jemina Alves

Women's Half-Middleweight
Tânia Ishii

Women's Middleweight
Rosicléia Campos

Women's Half-Heavyweight
Soraia André

Women's Heavyweight
Edilene Aparecida

Rhythmic gymnastics

Rowing

Men

Sailing

Men

Women

Open

Shooting

Men

Women

Swimming

Men

Synchronized swimming

Three synchronized swimmers represented Brazil in 1992.
Women

Table tennis

Tennis

Men's Singles Competition
Luiz Mattar 
 First round – lost to Paul Haarhuis (Netherlands) 6–4, 3–6, 2–6, 2-6
Jaime Oncins 
 First round – defeated Srđan Muškatirović (Independent Participant) 7–6, 4–6, 6-1
 Second round – defeated Michael Chang (United States) 6–2, 3–6, 6–3, 6-3
 Third round – defeated Mark Koevermans (Netherlands) 6–7, 0–6, 6-7
 Quarterfinals – lost to Andrei Cherkasov (Unified Team) 1–6, 4–6, 7–6, 6–4, 2-6

Men's Doubles Competition
Luiz Mattar and Jaime Oncins
 First round – lost to Emilio Sánchez and Sergio Casal (Spain) 3–6, 6–3, 7–6, 3–6, 1-6

Women's Singles Competition
Andrea Vieira-Arnold 
 First round – lost to Manuela Maleeva (Switzerland) 2–6, 3-6

Volleyball

Men

Preliminary round

Pool B

|}

|}

Quarterfinals

|}

Semifinals

|}

Gold-medal match

|}

Women

Preliminary round

Group B

|}

|}

Quarterfinals

|}

Semifinals

|}

Bronze-medal match

|}

Weightlifting

Men

Wrestling

See also
Brazil at the 1991 Pan American Games

References

External links
 Official website of the Brazilian Olympic Committee

Nations at the 1992 Summer Olympics
1992
Olympics